Cédric Ondo Biyoghé (born 17 August 1994) is a Gabonese professional footballer who plays as a forward for Maghreb de Fès in Morocco.

Career
Ondo started his club career with Cercle Mbéri Sportif before joining CF Mounana in 2015.

Ondo signed with AS Vita Club in January 2019. One year after joining Vita, he returned to Morocco, signing with Maghreb de Fès.

International
On 16 January 2016 Ondo made his debut for Gabon in the 2016 African Nations Championship against Morocco. He started the match and played the full ninety minutes as Gabon drew 0–0.

Career statistics

International

References

External links
Cédric Ondo Biyoghé at Footballdatabase

1994 births
Living people
Gabonese footballers
Gabonese expatriate footballers
Association football forwards
Gabon international footballers
2017 Africa Cup of Nations players
Cercle Mbéri Sportif players
CF Mounana players
El Dakhleya SC players
Olympic Club de Safi players
AS Vita Club players
Maghreb de Fès players
Egyptian Premier League players
Gabonese expatriate sportspeople in Morocco
Gabonese expatriate sportspeople in the Democratic Republic of the Congo
Expatriate footballers in Egypt
Expatriate footballers in Morocco
Expatriate footballers in the Democratic Republic of the Congo
Gabon youth international footballers
21st-century Gabonese people
Gabon A' international footballers
2016 African Nations Championship players